Kadunnut puutarha is the third album by Finnish pop rock band Indica, released in 2007.

Track listing
"Viimeinen jyvä" ("The Last Grain") - 2:45
"Linnansa vanki" ("Prisoner of the Castle") - 3:35
"Ikävän kantaja" ("Carrier of Longing") - 4:08
"Ulkona" ("Outside") - 4:05
"Nukkuu kedolla" ("Sleeps in the Field") - 4:25
"Noita" ("Witch") - 4:09
"Pahan tarha" ("Garden of Evil") - 4:06
"Äänet" ("Voices") - 3:27
"Mykkä" ("Mute") - 2:51
"Unten laiva" ("Ship of Dreams") - 3:51
"Helmet" ("Pearls") - 4:49

Personnel 

 Johanna "Jonsu" Salomaa – vocals, violin, guitars, keyboards
 Heini – bass guitar, backing vocals
 Sirkku – keyboards, clarinet, backing vocals
 Jenny – guitars, backing vocals
 Laura – drums

References 

2007 albums
Indica (band) albums